The No. 8 Hose Station is a small fire hall that is a Toronto landmark. It is located on College Street at Bellevue and marks the northern end of Kensington Market and serves the Chinatown area at Spadina and Dundas.

History
The hall was built in 1878 as part of the transformation of the Toronto Fire Department that saw it move from a volunteer to a professional organization. The station was home to horse drawn hose car. The clock tower, that quickly became a symbol of the neighbourhood, was added in 1899. From the top of the tower a lookout would watch for fires. It was also useful for hanging hoses to dry. In 1911 it received the city's first motorized fire engine.

Demolition pressure and fire
In the 1960s most of the old fire houses were demolished, but community pressure saved No. 8. However, in 1972 the building was gutted by fire. Again the community assured its survival and the building was rebuilt almost exactly as it had been before. The addition that stored the aerial ladder was replaced with the modern 3 bay addition that now houses the station's trucks. The original fire hall building is now used as a gym for Toronto Fire station 315.

The fire that gutted the hall in 1972 started when the crew was out fighting another fire

See also
 Toronto Fire Services

Fire stations completed in 1878
Towers completed in 1878
Municipal buildings in Toronto
Kensington Market
Defunct fire stations in Canada